The 2019 FIBA U20 Women's European Championship was the 18th edition of the Women's European basketball championship for national under-20 teams. Held from 3 to 11 August in Klatovy, Czech Republic, 16 teams participated in the tournament.

Venues

Participating teams

  (Runners-up, 2018 FIBA U20 Women's European Championship Division B)
 (hosts)  (Winners, 2018 FIBA U20 Women's European Championship Division B)

  (3rd place, 2018 FIBA U20 Women's European Championship Division B)

First round
The draw took place on 13 December 2018 in Belgrade, Serbia.

Group A

Group B

Group C

Group D

Knockout stage

Championship bracket

5th place bracket

9th place bracket

13th place bracket

Round of 16

9th–16th place quarterfinals

Quarterfinals

13th–16th place semifinals

9th–12th place semifinals

5th–8th place semifinals

Semifinals

15th place game

13th place game

11th place game

9th place game

7th place game

5th place game

3rd place game

Final

Final standings

Awards

All-Tournament Team
  Billie Massey
  Costanza Verona 
  Sara Madera (MVP)
  Tima Pouye 
  Valentina Kozhukhar

References

External links
FIBA official website

2019
2019–20 in European women's basketball
2019–20 in Czech basketball
International youth basketball competitions hosted by the Czech Republic
International women's basketball competitions hosted by the Czech Republic
2019 in youth sport
Klatovy District
August 2019 sports events in Europe